Marinomonas arenicola is a bacterium from the genus of Marinomonas which has been isolated from sediments of the Sea of Japan.

References

External links
Type strain of Marinomonas arenicola at BacDive -  the Bacterial Diversity Metadatabase

Oceanospirillales
Bacteria described in 2009